"Reflections of a Sound" is a song by Australian rock band Silverchair and is the fourth track on their fifth studio album Young Modern, released in March 2007. The song was released on 14 July 2007 as the second single from that album. The single was only released in Australia in digital format.

Music video
The music video for the single premiered on 8 June 2007. It was shot in Queensland by directing duo Damon Escott and Stephen Lance and their producer Leanne Tonkes. Like the album art for Young Modern, is heavily influenced by the "De Stijl" art movement. References to other artists such as Dalí, Da Vinci, Magritte, Mondrian and Warhol are also made. Post production by Corner Post (Sydney).

Track listing

Australian Digital release
 "Reflections of a Sound"
 "Straight Lines (live from Carriageworks Album Launch)"
 "Mind Reader (live from Carriageworks Album Launch)"
 "Luv Your Life (live from Carriageworks Album Launch) (iTunes Store only)"

Australian Promo CD (ELEVENCDPRO72)
 "Reflections of a Sound"
 This single comes in a semi-clear 5" Cd, housed in cardboard sleeve.

References

2007 singles
Silverchair songs
Songs written by Daniel Johns
Song recordings produced by Nick Launay
2007 songs
Eleven: A Music Company singles
Song recordings produced by David Bottrill